How to Follow Strangers is a 2013 drama film written and directed by Chioke Nassor. It opened The Lower East Side Film Festival in June 2013.

Synopsis 
A young man named Casey (Chris Roberti) becomes obsessed with an urban tragedy and disappears, wondering if anyone will notice. Eleanor (Ilana Glazer), a lonely young lady who shares his commuting schedule does notice. And when he resurfaces, she decides to follow him, setting of a chain of events that bind them together.

References

External links 
 

2013 films
2013 drama films